Ismael Blanco (born 19 January 1983) is an Argentine professional footballer who plays as a forward for Argentine club Club Ciudad de Bolívar.

Club career

Argentina
Blanco started his career with Colón in 2002. He suffered a serious knee injury (cruciate ligament) in 2004.

Having lost his place on the first team, after his rehabilitation he was loaned out in January 2005 to Club Libertad of Paraguay, where he had the opportunity to participate at the Copa Libertadores 2005, scoring twice during his team's unsuccessful effort in Group 1.

After his loan spell in Club Libertad, he returned in June 2005 to Argentina, to play on loan for Olimpo de Bahía Blanca, a Primera B Nacional team. During his stay there he managed to score 46 times in 90 games, helping his team win the Primera B Nacional and the promotion to Primera División and being the top scorer in both the Apertura 2006 (18 goals) and the Clausura 2007 (11 goals). In summer 2007, he rejoined Colón.

AEK Athens
He did not stay with Colon for long; on 10 August 2007 Blanco joined AEK Athens on loan. He got his first appearance in an UEFA Cup match against Red Bull Salzburg on 20 September 2007. He then debuted in the Superleague Greece against Atromitos and scored twice leading AEK Athens to a 2–0 win. Blanco's first goal in a European competition occurred on 13 February 2007 against Getafe with a back flick in the 94th minute to end the game as a 1–1 draw. Blanco finished top scorer in the 2007–08 Superleague Greece having scored 19 goals in 28 games (he scored once more during his six playoff apps). His performances led AEK Athens to announce the activation of the clause in his contract on 28 April 2008.

Blanco started his second season in AEK scoring the winning goal via a penalty against Panathinaikos in the year's first derby match. Blanco also stated to the press that he does not want to leave AEK and wants to be playing for many years in Greece. Blanco scored his first Greek Cup goal against Chaidari. Blanco finished top scorer in the 2008–09 Superleague Greece having scored 14 goals in 30 games (plus three goals at six playoff games). Blanco's third season at AEK wasn't as successful as the previous years as he scored only 13 goals all season, (eight in the league, four in Europe, one in playoffs). In his fourth season he scored 15 goals in all competitions. His first goals came in the 5–1 win against Panthrakikos F.C. for the Greek Cup, in which Blanco scored his first hat-trick. He scored also game winner against arch rivals Olympiakos in the 90th minute (he came in the game as a substitution).

Blanco decided not to renew his contract with AEK and not to accept the proposal of AEK and he was released to a free agent. Blanco promised that if ever returned in Greece that would be only to wear AEK Athens' colours.

San Luis
On 18 August 2011, Blanco was signed by Mexican club San Luis. He managed to score two goals in 15 appearances for the Mexican League.

Legia Warsaw
The 29-year-old cut short a spell in Europe with AEK to move to Mexican side San Luis last summer, but has quickly headed back to Europe. Blanco was highly rated back in 2007 when AEK snapped him up from Club Atletico Colon; the striker had enjoyed impressive spells on loan with Libertad and Olimpico. The striker will now hope to pick up his success in Europe with Polish outfit Legia Warsaw.

On 24 February 2012, Blanco was signed by Polish club Legia Warsaw until 30 June 2012 with an option of extending to another season. Legia managed to win the Polish Cup of that season. He was released on 15 May 2012 as he did not fulfil the club's expectations, having only scored two goals in the Polish Cup.

1860 Munich
After leaving Legia Warsaw, Blanco signed for TSV 1860 Munich, as well as his former teammate at AEK Athens, Grigoris Makos. He did not fulfill the expectations of the club, not finding the net in 13 caps for the 2. Bundesliga.

Return to South America
In February 2013, Blanco returned to his homeland, Argentina to join Lanús. He was given his favourite number, "18" On 16 June, Blanco scored twice against River Plate in a 5–1 victory. He scored five goals in 16 appearances for the 2013 Torneo Final and Lanús took the third place.

On 17 August 2014 Blanco signed a two years' contract for Barcelona SC an Ecuadorian sports club based in Guayaquil. The total amount of transfer is estimated to €2.9 million.

On 22 August 2016, he rejoined Colón.

On 11 August 2017, he joined Atlético Tucumán.

Egaleo
In January 2020, he joined Greek club Egaleo in the Football League, who compete in the Greek third tier. Blanco previously played for Club Atlético Mitre in the Argentine second division where he scored three goals in 11 matches last season. He did not renew his contract with the Argentine club and decided to return to Greece at the age of 37.

Celebration
On 26 September 2007, in a match against Veria, after putting AEK Athens in front, Blanco revealed a Zorro mask from his sock and drew a big Z in the air celebrating the winning goal. He kept doing so from time to time though referees usually punished him with a yellow card. As a result, he gained the nickname "Zorro" by the fans.

Personal life
Blanco is of Egyptian descent.

He is the oldest brother of Sebastián Blanco.

Career statistics

Honours

Olimpo
 Nacional B: 2006 Apertura, 2007 Clausura

AEK Athens
Greek Cup: 2010–11
Sydney Festival of Football: 2010

Legia Warsaw
Polish Cup: 2011–12

Lanús
Copa Sudamericana: 2013

Individual
Nacional B top scorer: 2006 Apertura, 2007 Clausura
Best foreign player of Greek Super League: 2007–08
Super League Greece top scorer: 2007–08, 2008–09
Greek Cup top scorer: 2008–09 , 2010–11

References

External links

Living people
1984 births
Argentine people of Egyptian descent
Argentine footballers
Egyptian footballers
Argentine expatriate footballers
Sportspeople from Entre Ríos Province
Association football forwards
AEK Athens F.C. players
Club Atlético Colón footballers
Barcelona S.C. footballers
Club Libertad footballers
Olimpo footballers
San Luis F.C. players
Legia Warsaw players
TSV 1860 Munich players
Club Atlético Lanús footballers
Atlético Tucumán footballers
Expatriate footballers in Ecuador
Argentine expatriate sportspeople in Ecuador
Expatriate footballers in Paraguay
Argentine expatriate sportspeople in Paraguay
Expatriate footballers in Mexico
Argentine expatriate sportspeople in Mexico
Expatriate footballers in Greece
Argentine expatriate sportspeople in Greece
Expatriate footballers in Poland
Argentine expatriate sportspeople in Poland
Egaleo F.C. players
Expatriate footballers in Germany
Argentine expatriate sportspeople in Germany
Argentine Primera División players
Paraguayan Primera División players
Primera Nacional players
Super League Greece players
Liga MX players
Ekstraklasa players
2. Bundesliga players
Ecuadorian Serie A players